Associazione Calcistica Dilettante Cormonese, or simply Cormonese, is an Italian association football club located in Cormons, Friuli-Venezia Giulia. It currently plays in Seconda Categoria Friuli-Venezia Giulia.

History
The Cormonese was founded in 1922. In 1943–44, with Central and Northern Italy occupied by the Nazis and the constitution of the Italian Social Republic (puppet state of Nazi Germany), Cormonese entered in the mixed National Division championship, in which found far more noble groups of his own region (Venezia Giulia) such as Triestina, Pro Gorizia, Ampelea, Udinese and Ponziana. Surprisingly he won the first three games (played against Monfalconese, Ponziana and San Giusto), even flying to the top of the Julian group, but subsequently collapsed, taking only one victory in the rest of the championship in front of 10 defeats, closing penultimate in front of Ponziana alone.

With the end of the war, Cormonese was admitted to the Serie C Alta Italia managed by the Lega Nazionale Alta Italia. In the 1945–46 season the team came close to promotion to Serie B: it clearly won Group A in front of Ponziana and Ampelea; Group A of the semifinals closed in second place (a group of three teams with Mestrina and Legnago) missing for two points the access to the final promotion. In the following two years, in which he played in the Northern Serie C managed by the Lega Interregionale Nord, the team was unable to maintain itself at high levels. Due to the notable reduction of Serie C clubs (from 18 to just 3 groups, then increased to 4), fifth place in Group F of the Northern Serie C 1947–48 was not enough to guarantee access to the National Serie C, and Cormonese was downgraded to the newly established interregional promotion league managed by the Northern Interregional League. In the 1948–49 season Cormonese closed Group F of Promozione Nord in last place, relegating to the regional league.

In the 1969–70 season he won promotion to Serie D on the field but gave up. Cormonese returned to play in a national division only in the 1996–97 and 1997–98 seasons in which she played in C.N.D. before relegating again to Eccellenza. At the end of the 2001–02 season, Cormonese, in economic difficulties, renounced enrollment in Eccellenza and retreated to Promozione. The same economic difficulties led to bankruptcy at the end of the following season. Meanwhile, in 2001 A.S.D. Calcio Cormòns had been founded which in 2003 enrolled in Terza Categoria and on 1st July 2009 took the name of A.C.D. Cormonese. The re-founded Cormonese returned to Promozione in the 2014–15 season, however relegating after only one season.

Recent seasons

Key

Honours
Eccellenza Friuli-Venezia Giulia (1st regional level)
Winners: 1969–70, 1995–96

Promozione Friuli-Venezia Giulia (2nd regional level)
Winners: 1962–63, 1966–67, 1993–94

Prima Categoria Friuli-Venezia Giulia (3rd regional level)
Winners: 2013–14

Seconda Categoria Friuli-Venezia Giulia (4th regional level)
Winners: 2010–11

Coppa Italia Dilettanti Friuli-Venezia Giulia
Runners-up: 1998–99

Supercup Friuli-Venezia Giulia
Runners-up: 1999

Stadium
The football field was built in the 1980s and is part of the Cormons sports center complex. After several years of struggles, the Municipality finally decides to build the new facility with an adjoining training ground. The construction phases are long and bureaucratic, until on 3rd December 1986, thanks to the interest of Colonel Luigi Goretti, a friendly match between AS Cormonese and the Italy military national football team was played in Cormons, to inaugurate the playing field (at the time still without stands).
Among the Azzurri players, coached by Francesco Rocca, great A.S. Roma defender, there were many Serie A players, including Luca Pellegrini and Ivano Bonetti (U.C. Sampdoria), Alberico Evani (A.C. Milan), Massimo Mauro (F.C. Juventus), Massimo Susic, originally from Mossa (Udinese Calcio), Massimo Brambati (A.S. Bari), Ciro Ferrara (S.S.C. Napoli), Aladino Valoti (Atalanta B.C.), Enrico Cucchi (Inter) and Mario Bortolazzi (Hellas Verona F.C.). In the ranks of the local club, the Cormonese player Sergio Marcon, who played 21 professional seasons in Serie A, B and C. After that game, which had considerable resonance, the Municipality decided to go ahead with the work of construction of the current stands. The club "Cormonese Calcio" started using the facility from the 1989–90 season.
The playing field was named after the national team player, who wore the local jersey, Germano Mian.

After the 2017 renovation, worth 176,000 euros, the stadium was renamed Stadio Atleti Azzurri.

Colors and badge 
ACD Cormonese colors were grey and red.

References

External links
Official website 
Cormonese page @ friuligol.it
Cormonese page @ tuttocampo.it
Cormonese page @ facebook.com

Cormonese
Cormonese
Cormonese